Leptolaelapidae is a family of mites in the order Mesostigmata.

Species

Australocheles W. Karg, 1983
 Australocheles holmi W. Karg, 1983
Ayersacarus Hunter, 1964
 Ayersacarus forsteri
 Ayersacarus gelidus
 Ayersacarus gressitti
 Ayersacarus hurleyi
 Ayersacarus knoxi
 Ayersacarus plumapilus Hunter, 1964
 Ayersacarus savilli
 Ayersacarus strandtmanni
 Ayersacarus woodi
Cosmetolaelaps Womersley, 1959
 Cosmetolaelaps desecti Costa & Allsopp, 1981
 Cosmetolaelaps dolicacanthus (Canestrini, 1884)
 Cosmetolaelaps microsetus Costa & Allsopp, 1981
 Cosmetolaelaps oligosetus Costa & Allsopp, 1981
 Cosmetolaelaps reticulatus Costa & Allsopp, 1981
 Cosmetolaelaps wallacei Costa & Allsopp, 1981
Evansolaelaps Marais & Loots, 1969
 Evansolaelaps angolaensis Marais & Loots, 1969
 Evansolaelaps curtipilus Marais & Loots, 1969
 Evansolaelaps kabobensis Marais & Loots, 1969
 Evansolaelaps leleupi Marais & Loots, 1969
 Evansolaelaps lingulatus Marais & Loots, 1969
 Evansolaelaps punctissima Marais & Loots, 1969
 Evansolaelaps trisetosus Marais & Loots, 1969
Indutolaelaps Karg, 1997
 Indutolaelaps jiroftensis Hajizadeh et al, 2017
 Indutolaelaps squamosus Karg, 1997
Leptolaelaps Berlese, 1918
 Leptolaelaps capensis
 Leptolaelaps elegans (Berlese, 1918)
 Leptolaelaps lambda
 Leptolaelaps lawrencei
 Leptolaelaps longicornea Karg, 1978
 Leptolaelaps macquariensis
 Leptolaelaps reticulatus Evans, 1957
Paradoxiphis Berlese, 1910
 Paradoxiphis armstrongi (Womersley, 1956)
 Paradoxiphis blackbolbi Costa & Allsopp, 1979
 Paradoxiphis bolboceras (Womersley, 1956)
 Paradoxiphis brevisetosus Costa & Allsopp, 1979
 Paradoxiphis brevisternum Costa & Allsopp, 1979
 Paradoxiphis circumsetosus Costa & Allsopp, 1979
 Paradoxiphis dimorphus Costa & Allsopp, 1979
 Paradoxiphis gigas Costa & Allsopp, 1979
 Paradoxiphis longanalis Costa & Allsopp, 1979
 Paradoxiphis longisetosus Costa & Allsopp, 1979
 Paradoxiphis matthewsi Costa & Allsopp, 1979
 Paradoxiphis rotundus Costa & Allsopp, 1979
 Paradoxiphis tenuibrachiatus Berlese, 1910
 Paradoxiphis waterhousei Costa & Allsopp, 1979
 Paradoxiphis womersleyi Costa & Allsopp, 1979
Prestacarus Clark in Clark & Hawke, 2012  
 Prestacarus tilbrooki (Hunter, 1967)
Pseudopachylaelaps Evans, 1957
 Pseudopachylaelaps ornatus Evans, 1957
Pulchraplaga Karg, 1997
 Pulchraplaga caledonia Karg, 1997
Stevacarus Hunter, 1970
 Stevacarus claggi Hunter, 1970
 Stevacarus evansi (Hunter, 1964)

References

External links

Mesostigmata